Maths + English is the third studio album by English rapper Dizzee Rascal. The album went gold in the UK after selling over 100,000 copies.

Background
Maths + English entered the UK Albums Chart at number seven, one position higher than his second album, Showtime (2004), which charted at number eight and his debut, Boy in da Corner (2003), which peaked at number 23.

The track "Wanna Be" features guest vocals from English pop singer Lily Allen. It pays tribute to the 1976 musical Bugsy Malone, specifically the song "So You Want to Be a Boxer?" which shares the same musical arrangements for the sections sung by Lily Allen.

Joss Stone was expected to feature on the song "Da Feelin'", but Dizzee Rascal stated that the song sounded too "poppy" with Joss Stone's hook, so she does not appear on the album.

The track "Pussy'ole" is rumoured to be a Wiley diss. Wiley responded to the track in a video circulating on YouTube, in which he also takes jabs at rappers Kano and Lethal Bizzle.

American hip hop duo UGK are featured on the track "Where's da G's". In return, Dizzee was featured on the track "Two Type of Bitches" along with Pimpin' Ken on UGK's 2007 album Underground Kingz.

On 29 April 2008 Definitive Jux released Maths + English on their independent label in the United States. The Def Jux version features new studio tracks "G.H.E.T.T.O." and "Driving" as well as a remix of the UGK-assisted "Where's da G's" by Def Jux label head El-P. It does not however contain the track "Pussyole (Old Skool)", due to sample clearance issues.

Track listing 

Notes
"Pussyole (Old Skool)" samples Lyn Collins' "Think (About It)" and Galactic Force Band's "Space Dust".
"Sirens" was omitted from the US version.
"Da Feelin'" was co-mixed by Shy FX.
"Wanna Be" samples "So You Wanna Be a Boxer" from the film musical Bugsy Malone.

Charts

References

2007 albums
Dizzee Rascal albums
XL Recordings albums